Mark H. Moore is the Hauser Professor for Nonprofit Organizations and Faculty Chair of the Hauser Center for Nonprofit Organizations at the John F. Kennedy School of Government at Harvard University. He is also the author of a strategic management book called Creating Public Value.

Education

Mark H. Moore earned a B.A. at Yale University (summa cum laude) with exceptional distinction in political science and economics as well as a M.P.P. and Ph.D. from the Kennedy School of Government, Harvard University.

Professional life

From 1974 to 2004, Moore was the Guggenheim Professor of Program Criminal Justice Policy and Management at the Kennedy School of Government. In 2004, he became the Hauser Professor for Nonprofit Organizations, a position he  still holds.  He is also the Founding Chairman of the School's Committee on Executive Programs, has served as chair for over a decade.

In the late 1990s and the 2000s, he has   been one of the primary critics of the New Public Management movement dominating public administration development in the 1980s and early 1990s and can be considered as one of the main contributors to the shift to public value management.

Research interests
 Public management and leadership;
 Civil society and community mobilization;
 Criminal justice policy and management.

See also
 Public value - a term used to mean the equivalent of shareholder value in public management.
 http://publicvalue.org/

Sources
 Mark H. Moore's profile on the Kennedy School of Government's website
 'From New Public Management to Public Value: Paradigmatic Change and Managerial Implications' by Janine O'Flynn

References

External links
Mark Moore at the John F. Kennedy School of Government
Creating Public Value on Google Books
Interview with Mark Moore by the Center for Leadership and Values in Society of the University of St. Gallen
personal website & blog -- http://publicvalue.org/

Living people
Harvard University faculty
Harvard Kennedy School alumni
Yale University alumni
Harvard Kennedy School faculty
Year of birth missing (living people)